Cooper John Bowman (born January 25, 2000) is an American professional baseball infielder for the Oakland Athletics organization.

Career
Bowman graduated from Stevens High School in Rapid City, South Dakota. He played college baseball for Iowa Western Community College. After two years, he transferred to the University of Louisville to play for the Louisville Cardinals.

New York Yankees
The New York Yankees selected Bowman in the fourth round of the 2021 MLB draft. In 2022, he played for the Hudson Valley Renegades.

Oakland Athletics
The Yankees traded Bowman, Ken Waldichuk, JP Sears, and Luis Medina to the Oakland Athletics for Frankie Montas and Lou Trivino on August 1, 2022.

References

External links

Living people
2000 births
Baseball players from South Dakota
Sportspeople from Rapid City, South Dakota
Florida Complex League Yankees players
Hudson Valley Renegades players
La Crosse Loggers players
Lansing Lugnuts players
Louisville Cardinals baseball players
Tampa Tarpons players
Iowa Western Reivers baseball players